The 2019 LKL Playoffs featured the eight best teams of the Lietuvos krepšinio lyga (LKL) basketball league in Lithuania, competing for the championship spot. This was the LKL playoffs' 25th edition. Žalgiris achieved their 21st title overall, ninth consecutive. 
 
The quarter-finals and semi-finals were played in a best-of-three format, with the higher seeded team playing the first and (if necessary) third game at home. The finals were played in a best-of-five format, with the higher seed team playing games 1, 3 and 5 (if necessary) at home.

Bracket

Quarterfinals 

|}

Semifinals 

|}

Third–place series 

|}

Finals 

|}

See also
2018–19 LKL season

References

External links
 LKL website

2018–19 LKL season